Koelreuteria , also known as chinese lantern tree, is a genus of three species of flowering plants in the family Sapindaceae, native to southern and eastern Asia.

The fruit is a three-lobed inflated papery capsule 3–6 cm long, containing several hard nut-like seeds 5–10 mm diameter.

The genus was named after Joseph Gottlieb Kölreuter, from Karlsruhe, Germany, by Erich Laxmann.

Uses
Koelreuteria are commonly used as focal points in landscape design in regions where they thrive.

In some areas, notably parts of eastern North America, they have become invasive species.

Notes

References
Flora of China: Koelreuteria species list

Sapindaceae
Sapindaceae genera